"Snag-it" is a song written by Joe "King" Oliver. Oliver recorded the song with his Dixie Syncopators in Chicago for Vocalion/Brunswick on September 17, 1926. Since then it has been recorded by numerous others, notably Louis Armstrong, Terry Lightfoot, Bunk Johnson, Humphrey Lyttelton, Ken Colyer's Jazzmen and contemporary artists such as Jeff Healey among many others.

"Snag-it" is a twelve bar blues. It is typical of the jazz style that predominated during Oliver's early career. "Snag-it" continues to be performed today, partly due to its historical significance. Oliver was Armstrong's teacher and mentor, the latter commenting that Oliver was a pioneer in the evolution of jazz. Oliver is significant as one of those who shaped the Creole sound of New Orleans jazz.

"Snag-it" appeared on the album of the same name by Franz Jackson, as well as on Armstrong's Satchmo: A Musical Autobiography.

References 

1926 songs
Songs written by King Oliver